Boomerang: Travels in the New Third World is a non-fiction book by Michael Lewis about macroeconomic consequences of cheap financing available during the 2000s. The book was released on October 3, 2011 by W. W. Norton & Company.

Overview
The text focuses on the themes discussed in his previous book, The Big Short, and is based on the articles that Lewis wrote for Vanity Fair magazine.

Reception

—Review by Forbes

—Review by The New York Times

References

External links
Profile on wwnorton.com

Finance books
Business books
W. W. Norton & Company books
Books by Michael Lewis
2011 non-fiction books